Christopher Andrew Swallow (born 27 December 1981) is a former English cricketer.  Swallow was a right-handed batsman who bowled right-arm off break.  He was born in Ipswich, Suffolk.

Swallow made his debut for Suffolk in the 1999 Minor Counties Championship against Bedfordshire.  Swallow has played Minor counties cricket for Suffolk from 1999 to present, which has included 55 Minor Counties Championship appearances and 55 MCCA Knockout Trophy matches. He made his List A debut against Denmark in the 1st round of the 2002 Cheltenham & Gloucester Trophy, which was held in 2001.  He made 5 further List A appearances for the county, the last of which came against Glamorgan in the 2005 Cheltenham & Gloucester Trophy. In his 6 matches, he scored 49 runs at an average of 16.33, with a high score of 29 not out. With the ball, he took just a single wicket, which came at an overall cost of 167 runs, with best figures of 1/62.

References

External links
Chris Swallow at ESPNcricinfo
Chris Swallow at CricketArchive

1981 births
Living people
Cricketers from Ipswich
English cricketers
Suffolk cricketers